Decima Research is a public opinion and market research company in Canada. It was founded in 1979 by Allan Gregg, a strategist for the Progressive Conservative Party of Canada. In 2007, it became a subsidiary of Harris Insights & Analytics. The Roper Center at Cornell University recognizes it as a "Historically Contributing Data Provider".

History
Gregg left Decima in 1994 and went into semi-retirement following the electoral disaster for the Progressive Conservatives in the 1993 election in which he was the key communications strategist for the party. Decima floundered for several years but rebounded and is now an important polling firm on voting intentions in Canada. Along with Ipsos-Reid, Decima conducts polling of the federal political scene in Canada on a regular basis, whether or not an election campaign is in progress.

Decima Research is sometimes known as Opinion Search, which is technically the name of an affiliated calling centre that they always use for their field work.

Decima Research invests a significant amount of time and money into process improvement and has a department dedicated solely to research and development. The investments related to internal systems span both Decima and Opinion Search.

References

External links
Decima homepage

Public opinion research companies
Market research companies of Canada
Business services companies established in 1979